KMXH (93.9 FM, "Mix 93") is a radio station broadcasting an urban adult contemporary format. Licensed to Alexandria, Louisiana, United States, the station is currently owned by Urban Radio Broadcasting.    Its studios are located in the Alexandria Mall and its transmitter is located off I-49 south of downtown Alexandria.

History 

The station was assigned the KDKS call letters on 1991-04-15.  On 1992-12-28, the station changed its call sign to KDKS-FM, on 1993-01-25 to KFAD, and on 2005-07-01 to the current KMXH.

References

External links
 

Radio stations in Louisiana
Urban adult contemporary radio stations in the United States
Radio stations established in 1991
Mass media in Alexandria, Louisiana
1991 establishments in Louisiana